James Andrew Dykes (born 15 November 1971 in Hobart, Tasmania) is an Australian cricketer who played for the Tasmanian Tigers from 1997 until 2001. He was a right-handed batsman and a right-arm medium-pace bowler.

See also
 List of Tasmanian representative cricketers

References

1971 births
Living people
Australian cricketers
Tasmania cricketers
Cricketers from Hobart